The ESA/ESO/NASA FITS (Flexible Image Transport System) Liberator is a free software program for processing and editing astronomical science data in the FITS format to reproduce images of the universe. Version 3 and later are standalone programs; earlier versions were plugins for Adobe Photoshop. FITS Liberator is free software released under the BSD-3 license.  The engine behind the FITS Liberator is NASA's CFITSIO library.

FITS has been a standard since 1982 and is recognized by the International Astronomical Union (IAU).  While not limited solely to image data, archives in the FITS file format include images of stars, nebulae and galaxies produced by space-based and ground-based telescopes from around the world.

Although the first version of the software was a tool used mainly by professional astronomers, efforts have been made to bring high quality astronomical images to the homes of amateur astronomers, educators and students. The FITS Liberator has become the industry standard for professional imaging scientists at the European Space Agency (ESA), the European Southern Observatory (ESO), and NASA. It uses images from the Hubble Space Telescope (HST) and the Very Large Telescope (VLT), among others, to craft beautiful colour astronomical images.

The first and second versions of the FITS Liberator were released in July 2004 and August 2005 respectively, the version, v3.0.1, was released in February 2012.

Version 1

Version 1 of the ESA/ESO/NASA Photoshop FITS Liberator was completed in July 2004 by imaging scientists at the European Space Agency (ESA), the European Southern Observatory (ESO), and NASA. Version 1 allowed all types of FITS images to be opened and also some limited interaction with the images.

Version 2

 The preview window
 Histogram
 Tools
 Statistics
 Advanced tools for scaling and stretch

The basic workflow is to open a FITS image, study it in the Preview window, adjust the black-and-white levels (6) to give a reasonable contrast and then set the input range for the scaling of the image by clicking the Auto Scaling Button (7). Now, different values of the Scaled Peak level can be tested to scale the image to better fit with one of the possible Stretch functions (8).

Version 2 of the ESA/ESO/NASA Photoshop FITS Liberator image processing software made it both easier and faster to create colour images from raw observations. Updates included:
 FITS images with up to 4 billion grey scales can be processed (32 bit support). 
 FITS images with up to 500 million pixels or more can be processed (100 times larger than standard images from a digital camera).
 Re-designed workflow and user interface. The plug-in remembers previous settings.
 New options for advanced scaling and stretching.

An entire section of v2.0 was dedicated to metadata input and the user also had access to a text version of the original FITS header.

With the advent of the FITS Liberator v2.0, it became possible for people at home to create spectacular pictures like the iconic Hubble image Pillars of Creation in a matter of minutes.

An updated version of the software containing new scaling and stretching tools is available that allows better manipulation of astronomical images. An update in v2.1 is the ability for users to embed descriptive information about the image and what it shows directly within the final image. Based on a new standard for Astronomy Visualization Metadata (AVM), this information is stored in the standard manner comparable to that used by digital cameras to record exposure information.

The ESA/ESO/NASA WFPC2 Mosaicator: This new add-on tool works on Hubble WFPC2 images. It will generate a single WFPC2 mosaic file from one WFPC2 file containing four CCD images in individual planes.

The ESA/ESO/NASA FITS Concatenator: This Adobe Photoshop script will combine the metadata from two or more individual exposures after the FITS Liberation process.

Version 3
Version 3.0 of the FITS Liberator include the following new features:

 FITS Liberator is a stand-alone application, no longer requiring Adobe Photoshop.
 Processing medium-sized images is up to 35% faster, thanks to significantly improved memory management.
 Processing large images are also faster thanks to delayed application of stretch functions.
 FITS Liberator saves TIFF files that open in almost any image processing software.

Version 4

Version 4.0 of the FITS Liberator was released on 4 March 2021, include the new features:

 64 bit operating systems are now supported.
 MacOSX, Windows and Linux support.
 Command Line Interface available for batch processing of FITS files.
 Full support for big images (even greater than available memory)
 Dark Mode.
 Full screen.

The Team
The team that produced FITS Liberator 1.0 to 3.0.1 consists of:

Project Executive: Lars Lindberg Christensen

Technical Project Manager: Lars Holm Nielsen

Developers: Kaspar K. Nielsen & Teis Johansen

Scientific, technical support and testing: Robert Hurt & David de Martin

The team that produced FITS Liberator 4 consist of:

Developers: David Zambrano Lizarazo & Juan Fajardo Barrero

Scientific, technical support and testing: Robert Hurt

GUI & Logo Design: David Zambrano Lizarazo

Project Executive: Lars Lindberg Christensen

Technical Project Manager: Javier Enciso

How to use it
For experienced users there is a Quick Start Guide available at the FITS Liberator website. 

For new users a Full User Guide for the FITS Liberator 3, can be obtained from the European homepage of the NASA/ESA Hubble Space Telescope.

References

External links
 The ESA/ESO/NASA FITS Liberator v3.0.1 spacetelescope.org
The FITS Liberator 4 page at NOIRLab
The FITS Liberator 4 page at BitPointer
NASA's CFITSIO

Free graphics software
Software using the BSD license